Orchard Hills is a suburb of Sydney, in the state of New South Wales, Australia 49 kilometres west of the Sydney central business district, in the local government area of the City of Penrith. It is part of the Greater Western Sydney region.

History
Orchard Hills takes its name from the orchards located on the area's undulating hills at the turn of the 20th century. In 1806, Governor Philip King granted  in what is now Orchard Hills to Mary Putland, the daughter of the incoming governor, William Bligh. She named the property Frogmore.

In  Rev. Samuel Marsden built Mamre, a two-storey Colonial Georgian homestead on the west side of what is now Mamre Road. The homestead was constructed of sandstone and is listed on the New South Wales State Heritage Register and the local government heritage register. It is now used as a function centre and is open for guided tours.

Adjoining the Frogmore Estate was the York Estate, originally owned by the York family. When it was subdivided in the late 1880s, the land was mainly sold for orchards and vineyards. By the early 1900s a rural community had established in the area and a village developed.

The Mount Hope Methodist Church was built in 1904 and the York Estate Public School was built in 1910. Until this time the area had no consistent name being known by different people as Frogmore, York and Mount Hope. A public meeting was called in October 1910 at the new school to choose a name and Orchard Hills won the day.

Description 
Orchard Hills is located in the center of the City of Penrith. Orchard Hills has a predominantly rural character with undulating hills and scenic vistas. Its landscape is mainly overlaid with orchards and grapevines with some housing development in recent years. This suburb epitomizes the City of Penrith's vision of a region with a harmony of urban and rural qualities.

Heritage listings 
Orchard Hills has a number of heritage-listed sites, including:
 Mamre Road: Mamre

Transport

In June 2020, a station at Orchard Hills on the Western Sydney Airport line due to be completed in 2026, was confirmed.

Climate

References

External links
 Mamre Official Website

Suburbs of Sydney
City of Penrith